Galium procurrens is a perennial herb in the family Rubiaceae.It is found in European deciduous forests in the Balkans and other parts of Europe, such as Italy and Northern Germany.G. procurrens has bluish-green whorls of 5-15 leaves and white flowers.

References

procurrens
Flora of Italy
Flora of Germany